Azad Toptik (born 12 February 1999) is a Turkish football player of Kurdish origin. He plays as a left winger for German club TSV Ilshofen in the sixth-tier Verbandsliga Württemberg.

Professional career
On 4 January 2019, Toptik moved to Kasımpaşa from VfB Stuttgart. Toptik made his professional debut for Kasımpaşa in a 1-0 Süper Lig loss to Çaykur Rizespor on 21 January 2019.

International career
Born in Germany, his father is from Diyarbakır, Turkey. Toptik is a youth international for Turkey.

References

External links
 
 
 
 FuPa Profile
 Kicker Profile
 DFB Profile

1999 births
People from Schwäbisch Hall
Sportspeople from Stuttgart (region)
Footballers from Baden-Württemberg
German people of Turkish descent
Living people
Turkish footballers
Turkey youth international footballers
German footballers
Association football midfielders
VfB Stuttgart II players
Kasımpaşa S.K. footballers
Ankaraspor footballers
Regionalliga players
Süper Lig players
TFF First League players